Simmonds as a surname may refer to:
 Ann Simmonds, English pentathlete
 Ellie Simmonds (born 1994), British Paralympic swimmer
 Henry Simmonds, Canada sailor at the 1932 Olympics
 Kaleb Simmonds, Canadian singer, Canadian Idol contestant
 Kennedy Simmonds, Saint Kitts and Nevis politician
 Kim Simmonds, Welsh guitarist
 Lizzie Simmonds, born Elizabeth Simmonds, English swimmer
 Megan Simmonds, Jamaican athlete
 Mark Simmonds, British politician 
 Matthew Simmonds, British demoscene musician
 Millicent Simmonds, American deaf actor
 Morris Simmonds (1855-1925), Virgin Islands-born German physician
 Posy Simmonds, British cartoonist
 Reece Simmonds, Australian rugby league player
 Robert Simmonds, Canadian police commissioner
 Samantha Simmonds, British television presenter
 Stuart Simmonds, English Cricketer and author
 Troy Simmonds, Australian rules footballer
 Wayne Simmonds, Canadian ice hockey player
 William Simmonds (disambiguation), various people, including
William Simmonds (craftsman) (1876–1968), English draftsman, artist and craftsman
William Simmonds (cricketer) (1892–1957), English cricketer
William Henry Simmonds (1860–1934), newspaper editor in Tasmania

Simmonds as a fictional character may refer to: 
 Jake Simmonds, in the British television series Doctor Who
 Lydia Simmonds, in the British television series EastEnders
 Norman Simmonds, in the British television series EastEnders
 Louise Raymond (née Simmonds), in the British television series EastEnders

Simmonds may also refer to:
 Simmonds Aircraft, British aircraft manufacturer 
 Simmonds' disease, a lack of anterior pituitary hormones

See also
 Simmons (surname)
 Simmons (disambiguation)
 Symonds
 Simonds (disambiguation)

English-language surnames
Patronymic surnames
Surnames from given names